Agartala Baptist Church is a Baptist Church in the city of Agartala, the capital of Tripura state in India. It is affiliated to the Tripura Baptist Christian Union (TBCU) and is located at Arundhutinagar in the southern part of Agartala city.

History 
It is the oldest church in Agartala and was established in the 1930s.

Controversy 
Religion has long been a source of tension in Tripura, with the state government accusing the TBCU of links with the National Liberation Front of Tripura,  which would be proscribed as a terrorist organisation in the 2002 Prevention of Terrorism Act. Guards had to be posted outside the headquarters of the Baptist Church in Agartala for fear of reprisals after the secretary of the Noapara Baptist Church was arrested in possession of explosives. Such fears were justified; the church in the nearby district of Krishnanagar was attacked by a mob in February the following year.

Affiliation 
The church comes under the Abhicharan Circle of the Sadar North Baptist Association of TBCU.

See also 
 National Liberation Front of Tripura
 Agartala City Baptist Church
 AKSB

Notes and references

Churches in Agartala
Tripura Baptist Christian Union
Baptist churches in India
Religious organizations established in the 1930s